The Democratic Union (Demokratski sojuz) is a political party in North Macedonia. 
At the legislative elections of 5 July 2006, the party won 2 out of 120 seats as part of coalition led by the Internal Macedonian Revolutionary Organization–Democratic Party for Macedonian National Unity.

Political parties in North Macedonia